Off the Wall is an arcade game produced by Atari Games and released in North America in 1991.  A remake of Breakout, it has a much wider variety of gameplay elements of the original. Most notably, it models spin on the ball. Off the Wall supports up to three players simultaneously (though most cabinets only support two). The game's graphics include many backgrounds modeled after modern abstract art.

Gameplay
The objective of Off the Wall is to score as many points as possible by destroying square blocks in a never-ending series of levels.  The player controls a paddle using an analog knob or a joystick (depending on the machine configuration).  The paddle moves along one edge of the playfield, and a ball flies around the playfield and bounces off the walls and the paddle.  When a ball hits a block, the block disappears (unless it is indestructible).  A square exit is placed on the screen, and directing the ball into this exit causes all remaining blocks on the screen to self-destruct, awarding bonus points and advancing the player(s) to the next level.

The ball occasionally splits in two (in multiplayer games, three balls may be on the screen at once), and the player can put spin on the ball, causing it to move in a curved trajectory.  The player loses a life when the last ball on the screen moves past the player's paddle, though in some circumstances, the game gives the player a second chance.  The game ends when the player runs out of lives.

As levels progress, the game introduces blocks that move randomly or in circles, powerups, indestructible blocks and bombs, blocks that parachute or fly in to replace destroyed blocks, objects that change the ball's speed and trajectory, and guns that can shrink players' paddles.  Depending on the number of players in the game, some levels may be skipped due to the exit being along one player's edge of the playfield.  In multiplayer games, a bonus round occurs periodically where players compete directly against one another in an exact clone of Pong.  The winning player earns an extra life.

Reception 
RePlay reported Off the Wall to be the twelfth most-popular arcade game at the time.

Legacy
Attempted home versions/ports of the game for the TurboGrafx-16 and the Game Gear were made, but this version was cancelled before these two made it to store shelves.

References

External links
Off the Wall at the Arcade History database

1991 video games
Arcade video games
Arcade-only video games
Atari arcade games
Breakout clones
Video games developed in the United States